This is a list of songs written by Roger Cook and Roger Greenaway, including those written by Cook or Greenaway solo, or with other writers.  The pair also performed, as David and Jonathan.

Chart hits and other notable songs written by Roger Cook and Roger Greenaway

Chart hits and other notable songs written by Roger Cook solo or with other writers

Chart hits and other notable songs written by Roger Greenaway with other writers

References

Cook, Roger